Mir Kuh-e Olya (also Romanized as Mīrkūh-e ‘Olyá; also known as Mīr Kūh-e Solţān and Mīrkūh-e Solţāná) is a village in Razliq Rural District, in the Central District of Sarab County, East Azerbaijan Province, Iran. At the 2006 census, its population was 208, in 37 families.

References 

Populated places in Sarab County